Mehdi Bayani (‎; 1906 – February 6, 1968) was the founder and the first head of the National Library of Iran, specialist in Persian manuscripts and calligraphy, writer, researcher, and professor at the University of Tehran.

Life and careers
Mehdi Bayani was born in 1906 in Hamedan, Iran. His father, "Mirza Mohammad Khan Mostofi Farahani", was from the succession of teachers and accountant of Farahan and his maternal ancestor was "Mirza Soleimaan Bayan ol-Saltaneh Farahani", the head of the royal exchequer and the author of "the treatise on the rules of clerking and accounting". At the age of two, his father died and his mother came to Tehran with him and other children. He studied elementary and calligraphy in the primary schools of "Aqdasiyeh" and "Ashraf". He spent his high school years at the Dar ul-Funun then entered the "Teachers High College" (now Kharazmi University) for a bachelor's degree in literary and philosophical sciences. After receiving his bachelor's degree, he entered University of Tehran. In 1945, received a doctorate in the field of "Persian language and literature" from the University of Tehran.

After passing the training course of the officer's college and military service, Bayani started teaching Persian language and Persian literature in 1933, while working in the library of the "Teachers High College", and in 1934 he was appointed the director of the public library of Islamic sciences. In this position, he collected books from the "Royal Library" and the "Library of Islamic Sciences" to establish the "National Library of Iran" and after the establishment of this library in 1937, he became its director.

In 1940, he was sent to the Department of Culture of Isfahan by the Ministry of Education (formerly the "Ministry of Culture") for a year, and after returning and completing a one-year educational mission, he was again appointed director of the National Library. In 1956, he became the director of the "Royal Library", a post which held until the end of his life. He was also a professor at the University of Tehran, where he taught "History of the Evolution of Islamic scripts" and "Bibliography of Manuscripts" courses.

He also founded an association to support and introduce calligraphers and the art of calligraphy called the "Association for the Support of Script and Calligraphers". He collaborated as an expert in manuscripts and prints with the National Library, the National Consultative Assembly's library and the Central Library of the University of Tehran due to his expertise in recognizing scripts and manuscripts. He himself had an elegant handwriting and was especially strong and skilled in Nastaliq. He is mentioned as one of the students of Mirza Hossein Khan Mostofi, a prominent calligrapher of Qajar era. The book "Biography and Works of Calligraphers" which he published in 4 volumes is one of the valuable research works in the field of biography and introduction of Iranian calligraphers that has preserved its value so far.

Bayani was one of the founders of the Iranian-Soviet cultural association and a member of it, and worked for nearly 25 years to expand and strengthen the friendly and cultural ties between these two neighboring countries. He had many cultural missions to Asian, European and American countries.

Death
Mehdi Bayani died of cancer on the February 6, 1968. He was buried in Ibn Babawayh Cemetery.

Legacy
The book "Fifty Years with Dr. Mehdi Bayani" deals with his life story, photographs and documents, and reviews Bayani's book the "Biography and Works of Calligraphers", has been published by the National Library of Iran on the occasion of the fiftieth anniversary of his death in 2018.

Lately, a virtual (due to COVID-19 pandemic restrictions) commemoration ceremony of Mehdi Bayani was held by the Society for the National Heritage of Iran on October 21, 2020.

Bibliography
His works are:

 Bibliography of Manuscripts
 Index of Nastaliq Elegant Script Exhibition of National Library
 Index of Royal Library (Diwans)
 Index of Persian sources, letters, essays and poems
 Index of exhibitions of Ibn Sina's works in the library of the Society for the National Heritage of Iran
 Index of exhibitions of works by Nasir al-Din al-Tusi in the National Library
 Index of Samples of Elegant Scripts of the Royal Library
 Guide to the Quran treasure in the Museum of Ancient Iran
 Some examples of calligraphers' scripts
 Example of Persian discourse
 Biography and works of calligraphers, in four volumes
 Biography and works of Manuscript-writers
 Shikasta-writers and Nastaliq-writers and Taliq-writers
 Biography and works of Mir Emad Hassani
 Preparation and publication of four Persian treatises (treatise in the state of infancy, one day with the Sufi community; Red Wisdom; The song of Gabriel's wing), by Shahab al-Din Yahya ibn Habash Suhrawardi
 The tragedies in the love of Ahmad Ghazali
 Ascension letter attributed to Ibn Sina, in the handwriting of Imam Fakhr Razi
 The best history or chronology of Kerman events by Afzal al-Din Kermani
 A few quatrains by Hakim Omar Khayyam in Mir Emad script
 Five hundred years of the history of royal jewelry in Iran
 Incomplete index of some books in the Royal Library
 Rosery Album: three treatises and four biographies; Serat al-Sotoor by Sultan Ali Mashhadi - Medad al-Khotoot by Mir Ali Heravi - Adaab al-Mashq by Mir Emad Hassani; With works by great calligraphers
 Collection of Dr. Mehdi Bayani
 A comprehensive list of Persian poems
 Translation and stories of the Qur'an from the endowment version of Torbat Sheikhe Jam, based on the commentary of Abu Bakr Atiq
 Index of Samples of Elegant Script of the Imperial Library of Iran that has been exhibited
 Two Persian treatises by Shahabuddin Suhrawardi
 An example of Persian prose from the Rudaki period, or the oldest Persian prose in existence
 Elegant Scripts Sample of the Imperial Library of Iran
 The workbook of prominents of Iran
 Calligraphers: Nastaliq-writers
 Lectures of the Association of Lovers of Books, Biography and Works of Mir Emad, the famous calligrapher of the Safavid era
 Research in the biography and works of Ibn Shahaba Yazdi (poet, historian and anonymous astronomer of the ninth century)

See also

 Iraj Afshar
 Keikhosro Khoroush
 Ismail Amirkhizi
 Amir Hossein Zekrgoo
 Mahmoud Mar'ashi Najafi

References

External links
 Mehdi Bayani - Oxford Reference
 Bayani, Mehdi - Grove Art
 National Library of Iran: establishment and early development Based on archival documents
 Bayānī, Mahdī [WorldCat Identities]

1906 births
1968 deaths
Academic staff of the University of Tehran
People from Hamadan
Iranian calligraphers
Faculty of Letters and Humanities of the University of Tehran alumni
Iranian librarians
Heads of the National Library of Iran
Deaths from cancer in Iran
20th-century Iranian people